Bascanus is a genus of beetles in the family Carabidae, containing the following species:

 Bascanus andreaei Basilewsky, 1961 
 Bascanus claeysbuooaerti Basilewsky, 1953 
 Bascanus dissidens Peringuey, 1908 
 Bascanus fortesculptus Basilewsky, 1961 
 Bascanus gracilis Peringuey, 1896 
 Bascanus leleupi Basilewsky, 1961 
 Bascanus longicollis Peringuey, 1896 
 Bascanus natalicus Basilewsky, 1961 
 Bascanus transvaalensis Basilewsky, 1961 
 Bascanus vandenberghei Basilewsky, 1953

References

Panagaeinae